Erkenek Tunnel, is a road tunnel in Malatya province, eastern Turkey opened in 2017 connecting Eastern Anatolia region with the Mediterranean Region.

Erkenek Tunnel is situated on the highway  between Doğanşehir in Malatya Province and Gölbaşı in Adıyaman Province, west of Erkenek village. It connects Eastern Anatolia with the Mediterranean Region bypassing the Erkenek Pass, which made the heavy truck traffic difficult during the winter season.

Construction of the tunnel began in 2011.As insufficient soil survey and boring works caused mass wasting and subsidence, it lasted six years due to additional ground reinforcement works. The cost of construction is  253 million (approx. US$ 72 million. The opening of the tunnel took place in presence of Minister of Transport, Maritime and Communication Ahmet Arslan, Minister of Customs and Trade Bülent Tüfenkci and some other high-ranked local officials on 28 May 2017.

References

Road tunnels in Turkey
Transport in Malatya Province
Tunnels completed in 2017
2017 establishments in Turkey